Richardson's leaf-toed gecko (Hemidactylus richardsonii) is a species of gecko. It is found in central Africa (Cameroon, Gabon, the Republic of the Congo, the Democratic Republic of the Congo, and the Central African Republic).

References

Hemidactylus
Reptiles of Cameroon
Reptiles of the Democratic Republic of the Congo
Reptiles of the Central African Republic
Reptiles of Gabon
Reptiles of the Republic of the Congo
Reptiles described in 1845
Taxa named by John Edward Gray